Marafioti is an Italian or Romani surname, and may refer to:

Oksana Marafioti -American writer of Armenian and Russian Romani descent
Girolamo Marafioti (active early 17th century) Italian priest and historian of Calabria

Surnames of Italian origin